KBGY (107.5 FM "Bob FM") is a commercial radio station licensed to Faribault, Minnesota, with a signal that reaches Mankato, Rochester and the southern suburbs of the Twin Cities.  It simulcasts a classic country radio format along with 106.1 KLCI Elk River and 105.5 KDDG Albany.  The stations are owned by Milestone Radio II LLC.

History
The station signed on in 2001.  After receiving its license, KBGY aired a simulcast of the Christian Contemporary music programming of 95.9 WLKX Forest Lake ("Spirit FM").

In late 2004, KBGY was leased to a radio group which flipped the station's format to Spanish language contemporary hits, the first such station on FM in Minnesota. The station aired Spanish-language broadcasts of select Minnesota Twins games.

On August 4, 2006, the NBA announced that twelve Minnesota Timberwolves basketball games during the 2006–07 season would air on KBGY in Spanish.

KBGY was also a secondary outlet for Minnesota Wild hockey games, when pre-empted by Wild flagship station WCCO 830 AM. These games, however, were in English.

In January 2008, KBGY started simulcasting the morning show from KLCI 106.1 in Elk River, MN, and KDDG 105.5 in Albany, MN.  The rest of the day, KBGY had separate programming.  In 2015, KBGY started simulcasting KLCI and KDDG full-time, with all three stations calling themselves "Bob FM."

External links
KBGY official website

Classic country radio stations in the United States
Radio stations established in 2001
2001 establishments in Minnesota